Esselenichthys is a genus of marine ray-finned fishes belonging to the family Stichaeidae, the pricklebacks and shannies. These fishes are found in the eastern central Pacific Ocean.

Species
The following species are classified within the genus Esselenichthys:

References

Xiphisterinae
Taxa described in 1990